Keiss is a fishing village at the northern end of Sinclair's Bay on the east coast of Caithness county in  Scotland's Highland Council area.

Keiss castle
Keiss Castle, which is now partially ruined, is located less than 1 mile north of the village centre, on sheer cliffs overlooking the bay, and has been a major tourist attraction for many years. The castle was likely built in the late 16th century and was first recorded as being under the ownership of the Sinclair Earls in 1623. Keiss House replaced Keiss Castle around 1755.

Notable People

Rev David Carment (1772-1856) leading figure in the Disruption of 1843 born and raised in Keiss.

References

Populated places in Caithness